Puma or PUMA may refer to:

Animals 
 Puma (genus), a genus in the family Felidae
 Puma (species) or cougar, a large cat

Businesses and organisations
 Puma (brand), a multinational shoe and sportswear company
 Puma Energy, a mid- and downstream oil company
 People United Means Action, originally named "Party Unity My Ass", a political action committee during the 2008 U.S. presidential election

Languages
 Puma language, a language of Nepal
 Teanu language or Puma, a language of the Solomon Islands

People
 Carlos Landín Martínez,  El Puma, Mexican drug lord
 José Luis Rodríguez (born 1943),  El Puma, Venezuelan singer and actor
 Puma King (born 1990),  Puma, Mexican wrestler
 Puma Swede (born 1976), Swedish pornographic actress
 Ricochet (wrestler) (born 1988),  Puma, American wrestler
 T. J. Perkins (born 1984),  Puma, American wrestler
 Puma Jones member of Black Uhuru

Places
 Puma (village), Solomon Islands
 Puma (Tanzanian ward)

Sports
 Pumas (Currie Cup), a South African rugby union team representing Mpumalanga province
 Los Pumas, the Argentina national rugby union team
 Pumas de la UNAM or Club Universidad Nacional, a Mexican league football club

Science and technology
 Puma (microarchitecture), a computer microarchitecture by AMD
 Puma (web server), an HTTP web server
 Puma (Hewlett-Packard), a codename for the HP 1000CX palmtop PC
 Mac OS X Puma or Mac OS X 10.1, an operating system
 Programmable Universal Machine for Assembly, an industrial robot arm 
 Protected User Mode Audio (PUMA), a subset of Protected Media Path, a DRM technology 
 p53 upregulated modulator of apoptosis (PUMA), a pro-apoptotic protein
 Paediatric-use marketing authorisation (PUMA), by the European Medicines Agency

Transportation

Aircraft
 Aero-Service Puma, a Polish ultralight aircraft
 Aérospatiale SA 330 Puma, a helicopter
 BDC Aero Puma, a Canadian ultralight aircraft
 AeroVironment RQ-20 Puma, an American unmanned surveillance aircraft

Automobiles
 Puma (car manufacturer), a Brazilian, then South African, brand of sports cars
 Puma (kit car company), an Italian brand of dune buggy and sports kit-car
 Ford Puma (crossover), an American-German subcompact SUV
 Ford Puma (sport compact), an American-German compact sports coupe
 Personal Urban Mobility and Accessibility (PUMA), an experimental vehicle by Segway and General Motors

Combat vehicles
 Puma (AFV), an Italian family of armoured fighting vehicles
 Puma (IFV), a German infantry fighting vehicle
 Puma armored engineering vehicle, an Israeli combat engineering vehicle
 PUMA M26-15, a South African armoured personnel carrier

Other uses
 Puma (band), a Norwegian experimental jazz ensemble
 Puma (comics), a comic book character Thomas Fireheart
 Public Use Microdata Area (PUMA), geographic units used by the U.S. Census
 "Puma", a song by TXT from their 2020 EP The Dream Chapter: Eternity

See also
 Lake Puma Yumco, a lake in Tibet
 Pumapunku, an archeological site in Tiwanaku, Bolivia

Animal common name disambiguation pages